Giorgi Aptsiauri (born November 20, 1994) is a Georgian rugby union player. His position is fullback or winger and he currently plays for AIA Kutaisi in the Georgia Championship and the Georgia national team.

References

Rugby union locks
Rugby union players from Georgia (country)
Living people
1994 births
Rugby union players from Tbilisi
Georgia international rugby union players